Articles (arranged alphabetically) related to Mozambique include:



0-9 
 1975 independence

A 
 Angola

B 
Beira Railway Project

C 
Cabo Delgado Province
 Cabora Bassa artificial lake
Cabora Bassa Hydroelectric Generation Station
 Cahora Bassa (HVDC)
 Canal de Moçambique
 Cashew Industry Association
 Cashew nuts
 Cashews in Mozambique
 Citrus fruit
 Communications in Mozambique
 Cotton
 Culture of Mozambique

D 
 Demographics of Mozambique
 Districts of Mozambique

E 
 Economy of Mozambique
 Education in Mozambique
 Eswatini
 Ethnic groups in Mozambique

F 
Food security in Mozambique
Foreign relations of Mozambique
FRELIMO

G 
Gaza Province
 Geography of Mozambique
Graça Machel
 Gokomere

H

I 
Ilmenite
 Indian Ocean
 Inhambane Province
 International Bank of Mozambique BIM
 Islam in Mozambique

J

K 
Kenmare Moma Mining Ltd (KMML) of Ireland - titanium
Kenmare Moma Processing Ltd (KMPL) titanium
Kenmare Resources titanium

L 
 Lake Malawi
 Languages of Mozambique
 LGBT rights in Mozambique
 List of cities in Mozambique
 List of Mozambicans
 List of national parks of Mozambique
 List of cities in Mozambique by population

M 
Makua people
Malawi-Mozambique power connection
Maputo
Maputo Bay
Maputo Port
Maputo Province
Maputo River
Marromeu sugar project
mCel
mediaFAX
Mineral industry of Mozambique
Mozal
Mozal aluminum project
Mozambique
Mozambique Cellular
Mozambique Channel
Mozambique (disambiguation)
Military of Mozambique
Music of Mozambique
Makhuwa language

N 
 Nampula Province
 Nelson Mandela
 Alcido Nguenha, current education minister
 Niassa Province
 Nacala

O

P 
 Politics of Mozambique
 Portugal
 Portuguese language
 Provinces of Mozambique
 Psikhelekedana
 Port of Nacala

Q 
Quelimane

R 
 Regions of Mozambique

S 
 SADCC
 Samora Machel 1st president
 Savana independent weekly
 Shire River
 South Africa
 Southern Africa

 Shona
 Sena

T 
 Tanzania
 TDM Group
 Telecommunication de Mozambique
 Tembe River
Tete Province
 Titanium
 Titanium in Africa
 Titanium in Mozambique
 Transport in Mozambique

U 
United States Ambassador to Mozambique
Universal Church
 Universidade Eduardo Mondlane

V 
 Visabeira cable tv

W 
 Water supply and sanitation in Mozambique
 Winnie Mandela

X

Y 
Yao people (East Africa)

Z 
 Zacoccia
 Zambezi River
 Zambia
 Zimbabwe

See also

Lists of country-related topics - similar lists for other countries

 
Mozambique